Yahualica may refer to:

Yahualica de González Gallo, a town and municipality in Jalisco, Mexico
Yahualica, Hidalgo, a town and municipality in Hidalgo, Mexico